= Wadakura Bridge =

Bridge in Chiyoda, Tokyo, Japan

Wadakura Bridge 和田倉橋
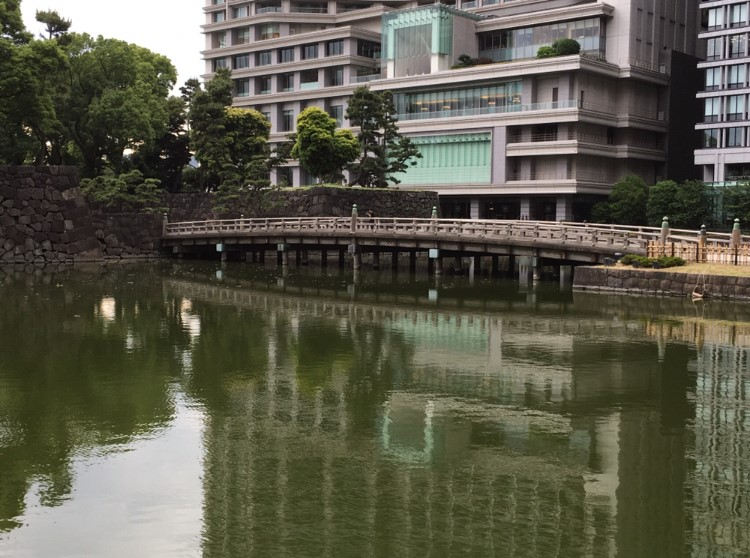
- The bridge in 2019
- Coordinates: 35°41′01″N 139°45′43″E
- Locale: Chiyoda, Tokyo, Japan

The Wadakura Bridge is a bridge in Chiyoda, Tokyo.

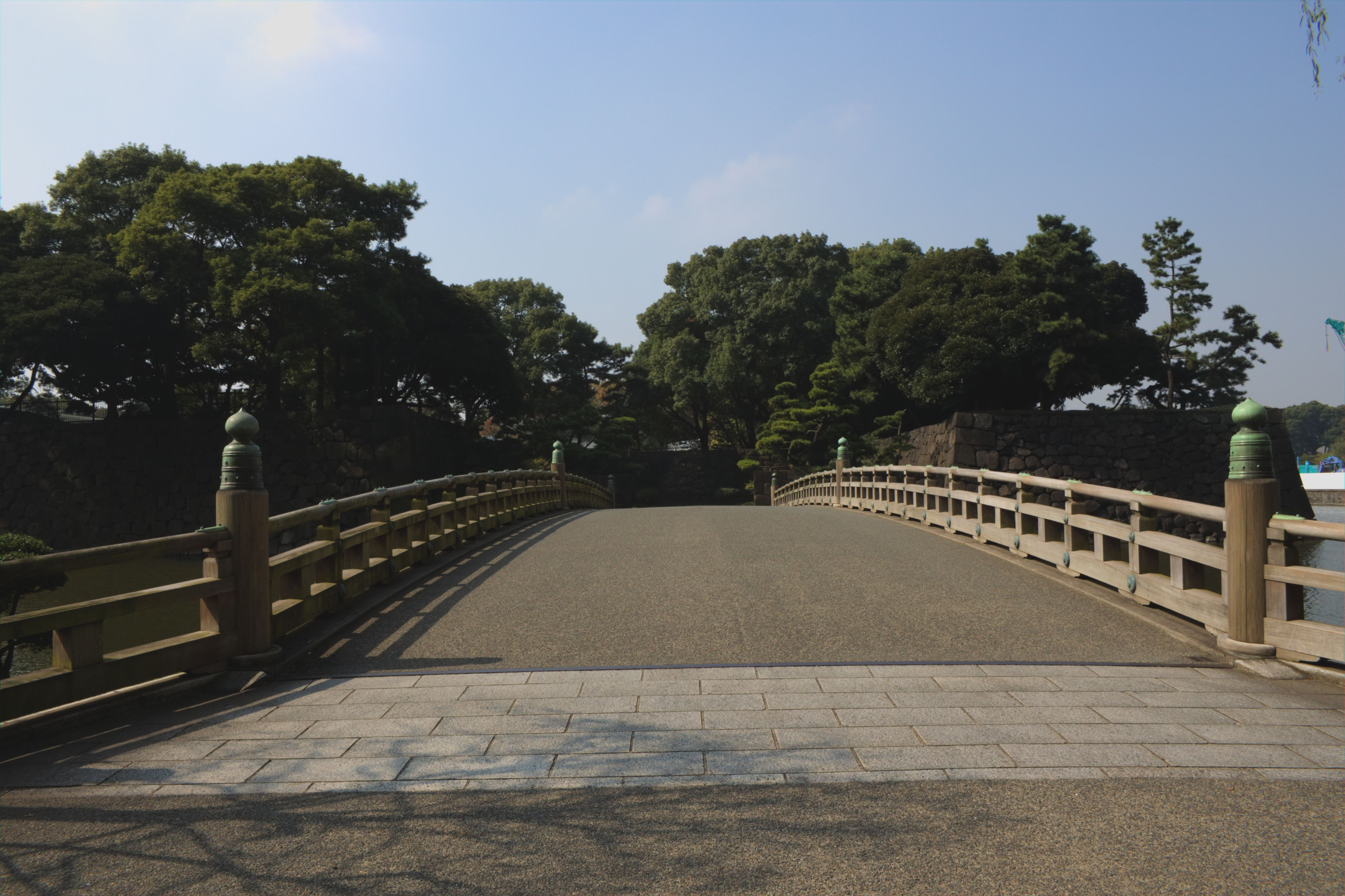
The bridge in 2009
